The men's 10 metre platform, also reported as highboard diving, was one of four diving events on the diving at the 1948 Summer Olympics programme.

The competition was held on Tuesday 3 August, on Wednesday 4 August, and on Thursday 5 August. It split into two sets of dives:

Compulsory dives
Divers performed four pre-chosen dives (from different categories) – a running straight header forward, straight somersault backward, running straight mollberg (gainer) reverse somersault, and armstand with forward cut through. 
Facultative dives
Divers performed four dives of their choice (from different categories and different from the compulsory).

Twenty-five divers from 15 nations competed.

Results

References

Sources
  
 

Men
1948
Men's events at the 1948 Summer Olympics